The 34th International 500-Mile Sweepstakes was held at the Indianapolis Motor Speedway on Tuesday, May 30, 1950. The event was part of the 1950 AAA National Championship Trail. It was also race 3 of 7 in the 1950 World  Championship of Drivers and paid points towards the World Championship. The event, however, did not attract any European Formula One drivers for 1950. Giuseppe Farina originally planned to enter, but his car never arrived. The Indianapolis 500 would be included on the World Championship calendar through 1960.

The race was originally scheduled for 200 laps (500 miles), but was stopped after 138 laps (345 miles) due to rain.

A rumor circulated in racing circles during and after this race that Johnnie Parsons's team discovered an irreparable crack in the engine block on race morning. The discovery supposedly precipitated Parsons to charge for the lap leader prizes. Presumably, he set his sights on leading as many laps as possible before the engine inevitably was to fail. Furthermore, the race ending early due to rain supposedly saved Parsons's day allowing him to secure the victory before the engine let go. However, the engine block crack was proved to be an urban myth, and it was said to be a very minor but acceptable level of porosity, which did not significantly affect the performance.

Parsons's win saw him score 9 points and move to a temporary first-place tie (after 3 races on the Formula One season calendar) in the first ever World Drivers' Championship, alongside Nino Farina and Juan Manuel Fangio, and also saw him become the first American to win a World Championship race. Parsons is one of only three drivers to have won his first World Championship race, the other two being Farina, who won the first World Championship race (the 1950 British Grand Prix, 17 days earlier) and Giancarlo Baghetti, who won the 1961 French Grand Prix. Despite the 500 being his only race in the  World Championship, it would be enough to see him finish the championship 6th in points.

During the month, Clark Gable and Barbara Stanwyck were at the track to film scenes for the film To Please a Lady.  Stanwyck was on hand in victory lane after the race for the traditional celebratory kiss to the winner.

Time trials

Time trials was scheduled for six days.

Saturday May 13: Walt Faulkner won the pole position with a record run of 134.343 mph.
Sunday May 14
Saturday May 20: The third day of time trials saw six cars complete runs. Bayliss Levrett (131.181 mph) was the fastest of the afternoon. Charles Van Acker was ruled physically disqualified, after a crash he suffered at the Speedway from 1949.
Sunday May 21
Saturday May 27: The day began with 11 spots open in the grid.
Sunday May 28: Only one driver managed to bump his way into the field. Johnny McDowell bumped Cliff Griffith, while 15 other cars failed to make the field. The two Novi entries failed to qualify – Chet Miller had engine trouble in one of the cars, while the other snapped a supercharger shaft. Rain and two crashes cut the track time to less than three hours. Cy Marshall was among the few left in line when time trials closed at 6 p.m.

Box score

Notes
 – Includes 1 point for fastest lead lap
 = past winner
 = rookie

Notes
 Pole position: Walt Faulkner – 4:27.97
 Fastest Lead Lap: Johnnie Parsons – 1:09.77
 Shared drivers:
 Joie Chitwood (82 laps) and Tony Bettenhausen (54 laps), after Bettenhausen retired. Points for 5th position were shared between the drivers.
 Henry Banks (71 laps) and Fred Agabashian (41 laps)
 Bayliss Levrett (105 laps) and Bill Cantrell (3 laps)
 First win for Firestone in the World Championship.

Qualifying

First alternate

Non-qualifiers

Championship standings after the race 
World Drivers' Championship standings

 Note: Only the top five positions are listed. Only the best 4 results counted towards the Championship.

Broadcasting

Radio
The race was carried live on the Mutual Broadcasting System, the precursor to the IMS Radio Network. The broadcast was sponsored by Perfect Circle Piston Rings and Bill Slater served as the anchor. Sid Collins moved into the booth for the first time to serve as analyst, and conducted the victory lane interview at the conclusion of the race. The broadcast feature live coverage of the start, the finish, and live updates throughout the race.

Prior to the race, it was reported that Slater might miss the race, due to illness. WIBC personality Sid Collins was named as a replacement, however, Slater was able to arrive in time for race day. Collins, who had previously served as a turn reporter, was invited to be the co-anchor in the booth. For the first time, Collins interviewed the winner in victory lane at the conclusion of the race. Collins claims he burned his trousers on Parsons's hot exhaust pipe during the interview, which took place in the rain.

Because the race was shortened, Mutual had to interrupt Queen for a Day to cover the finish of the abbreviated event. This was cited by some as a reason why the Speedway would begin flag-to-flag coverage in 1953.

Television
The race was carried live for the second year in a row on local television on WFBM-TV channel 6 of Indianapolis. Earl Townsend, Jr. was the announcer, along with Dick Pittenger and Paul Roberts. After the race, Speedway management disallowed WFBM from broadcasting the race live again, feeling that gate attendance had been negatively affected.

References

External links
Indianapolis 500 History: Race & All-Time Stats – Official Site
1950 Indianapolis 500 Radio Broadcast, Mutual
Van Camp's Pork & Beans Presents: Great Moments From the Indy 500 – Fleetwood Sounds, 1975
1950 Indianapolis 500 at RacingReference.info (Relief driver statistics)

Indianapolis 500 races
Indianapolis 500
Indianapolis 500
Indianapolis
1950 in American motorsport